

Pre 1900 
1854 – City of New Westminster established as capital for Crown colony of BC
1886 – Decision to move CPR to Burrard Inlet (instead of New Westminster)
1886 – Vancouver's first City Council made a momentous decision by petitioning the Federal Government to lease 1,000 acres of a largely logged peninsula for park and recreation purposes.
September 27, 1888 – Stanley Park was officially opened establishing the fledgling city's first official "greenspace". Council decided to set up an autonomous and separately elected committee to govern all park and recreation matters in Vancouver. And so the Vancouver Board of Parks and Recreation was born, the only elected body of its kind in Canada. The system now includes more than 200 parks (over 1300 hectares) but its heart remains in the cool, lush, evergreen oasis of Stanley Park, named for Lord Stanley, Governor General of Canada in 1888 when the park was officially opened.
1890 – Vancouver Electric Railway and Light Co. oversees the launch of Vancouver's first electric street car service
1891 – Westminster and Vancouver Tramway Co. begins its interurban rail passenger service from New Westminster to Vancouver

1900–1940 
1910 – The "City Beautiful movement" comes to Vancouver
1918 – The Vancouver Natural History Society (Nature Vancouver) is founded
1921, January –  BC Electric discontinues the 15-year-old practice of exchanging burned-out carbon filament lamps for free new ones. Tungsten and nitrogen are used instead.
1928 – Harland Bartholomew, a scientific city planner, presents his comprehensive plan to the City
1929 – Jan. 1st, amalgamation of the Vancouver, South Vancouver and Point Grey districts
1930s – West Coast modernism emerges (concrete highrises, freeways) – the labour force only knows how to build in the modernist tradition;
1935–1936 – City Hall is built
1936 – Non-Partisan Association (NPA) established to maintain political local non-interference in local development politics and to reduce NIMBY political responses

1940–1950 
1942 – Traffic Planning Manual – the consolidation of engineering know how on transportation in a manual with codes, standards and instructions – marks the shift in city planning to focus on accommodating cars and motor ways
Post War II – Italian and Greeks build the water and sewage infrastructure for the city
1943 – The Vancouver Foundation is created
1946 – Recommendation by City of Vancouver planners to form a regional planning board
1946 – The Vancouver Savings & Credit Union (Vancity), a cooperative credit union, is created; its objectives are grounded in social sustainability
1948 – Fraser River flood 
1949 – June 21, creation of Lower Mainland Regional Planning Board
1949 – September 15, first meeting emphasizes seamless lines to a natural landscape, view corridors, connection to nature

1950–1960 
1950 – Sept., LMRPB begins official operations
1952 – 1st report: "Lower Mainland Looks Around"
1952 – The Air Pollution Control society is incorporated
1953 – Vancouver Charter granted by province gives city greater powers of self-government
1954 – Gerald Sutton Brown, Planner and Co-Director of the Technical Planning Board – considers how to develop the city around the car

1960–1970 
Women's movement, blacks, gay-lesbian; popular culture rises; federal government providing funding for public participation, social housing, infrastructure, post-war development
1961 to 1962 – BC Electric becomes a Crown Corporation - BC Hydro and Power Authority (BC Hydro)
1962 to 1972 – development of the West End, displacement of homes for block highrises; in response to rapid development, neighbourhood movements form
1964 – Chance and Challenge"
1966 – Official Regional Plan" and "A Regional Parks Plan"
1967 – The Greater Vancouver Regional District (GVRD) is created
1967 – The project to build a large interurban freeway is rejected; Vancouver would become the only North American major metropolitan area without an inner-city highway
1968 – Expo
1968 – December, Scientific Pollution and Environmental Control Society (SPECS) founded
1969 – LMRPB dissolved by W.A.C. Bennett
1969 – September 2, 'Don't Make a Wave' protest against US nuclear testing at Amchitka Island in October
1969 – A small group of BC environmental activists becomes affiliated with the Sierra Club
1969 – The Society Promoting Environmental Conservation (SPEC) is founded

1970–1980 
1970 – The Electors' Action Movement (TEAM) council articulates concerns for a 'livable city'
1971 – Gastown Riot
1971 – Greenpeace established
1972 – Changes to the Canadian Immigration Act
1972 – Shirley Chan, Darlene Marzari and the residents of Strathcona stop  the freeway into Vancouver
1972 – TEAM leads city council and advocates for more participatory planning practices
1972 – May 2, Provincial Societies office in Victoria registers 'Greenpeace Foundation'
1973 – Agricultural Land Reserve established
1974 – West Coast Environmental Law launched
1976 – Habitat Conference
Heritage Preservation Act (Provincial NDP introduces this)
Development of South West False Creek
1977 – The Canadian Environmental Network (RCEN) begins to connect environmental organizations across the country

1980–1990 
1980 – The Wilderness Committee is founded
1981 – Affiliated with the RCEN, the British Columbia Environment Network (BCEN) starts acting in the province specifically
1982 – Mike Harcourt elected Mayor
1986 – Expo 86
Post Expo – high density urban development plan 
Gordon Campbell elected Mayor – puts greater focus on the regional district
1986 – Skytrain officially begins its operations
1986 – Spearheaded by Linda Crompton, VanCity launches its socially responsible mutual fund, the Ethical Growth Fund

1990–2000 
1990 – VanCity establishes the first EnviroFund
1990 – David Suzuki launches the environmental organization holding his name together with other thinkers and activists
1991 – The organization Better Environmentally Sound Transportation (BEST) is founded by a group of cyclists
1992 – The EcoDesign Resource Society is created
1993 – The International Institute for Sustainable Cities is established in Vancouver
1993 – Farm FolK / City Folk is founded
1994 – VanCity Credit Union sponsors Vancouver's first "Greening our Cities" Conference (with the Social Planning and Research Council (SPARC) of B.C., in association with the David Suzuki Foundation) at the Maritime Labour Centre near the Port of Vancouver
Participants from the Lower Mainland, Vancouver, Winnipeg, Victoria, and San Francisco
This conference was a "seeding operation" to the process of an alternative urban development plan
1995 – CityPlan: Direction for Vancouver
1996 – Livable Region Strategic Plan (LRSP)
1997 – Community Visions Program
1997 – The nonprofit charitable land trust The Land Conservancy (TLC) is founded
1998 – Canada's Action Plan for Food Security in response to the World Food Summit Plan of Action
1999 – As a result of concerns about sustainable growth, the organization Smart Growth BC is created

2000–2010 
2000 – Led by students and with the intention to benefit the surrounding community as a whole, the UBC Farm project begins
2000 – ForestEthics is founded
2001 – Vancouver architect Peter Busby chairs the Sustainable Building Canada Committee under the Royal Architectural Institute of Canada
2002 – Confederation of Progressive Electors resides over city council
2002 – BEST  receives the first Vancity grant award of 1 million dollars, used to help launch the Central Valley Greenway project
2002–2003 – In a competition involving 9 cities all over the world, the Canadian team develops a 100-year, urban-sustainable plan for Greater Vancouver and wins the Grand Prize; the entry is named cityPLUS, referring to Cities Planning for Long-term Urban Sustainability
2003 – The Canada Green Building Council is officially launched in Vancouver
A coalition of public and private sector partners in the building industry, aims to accelerate the advancement of environmentally sustainable buildings
Responsible for certifying buildings under the Leadership in Energy and Environmental Design (LEED) Program
2003 – Vancouver is elected as the host city of the 2010 Winter Games
2004 – April 16, Seabird Island First Nation revealed green homes that last up to 100 years.
2004 – The BC Sustainable Energy Association (BCSEA) is launched
2005 – The Community Gardens Policy is revised
2006 – Vancouver hosts the World Urban Forum
2007 – "BC Energy Plan: A Vision for Clean Energy Leadership"
2007 – The very first Jane's Walk, promoting walkable neighbourhoods and which would later spread in many cities all over the world, including Vancouver, happens in Toronto
2009 – Canada Line, linking downtown Vancouver to the airport, opens to the public
2009 – May 19,Contribution to help fund aboriginal involvement in renewable energy hydro-projects in B.C.
2009 – July 17, B.C. First Nation unveils solar power project in the Tsouke Nation.
2009 – BC's Green Energy Task Force

2010–Today 
2010 – The Olympic and Paralympic winter games take place
 17 days of Olympic Games events, 2566 athletes, 82 participating countries, 10,000 media representatives and 3 billion television viewers worldwide.
2011 – April 5, Premier Christy Clark announced that First Nations that were interested in pursuing clean energy business can now access a unique provincial government fund.
2011 – July 20, People in 16 aboriginal communities benefited from the first round of funding from the First Nations Clean Energy Business Fund.
2011 – The Greenest City action plan (GCAP) is a City of Vancouver urban sustainability initiative which was approved by Vancouver city council in July 2011.

References

History of Vancouver
Politics of Vancouver
Environment of Canada